Ivo Frosio (27 April 1930 – 18 April 2019) was a Swiss football midfielder who played for Switzerland in the 1954 FIFA World Cup. He also played for Grasshopper Club Zürich and FC Lugano.

References

External links
FIFA profile

1930 births
2019 deaths
Swiss men's footballers
Switzerland international footballers
Association football midfielders
Grasshopper Club Zürich players
FC Lugano players
1954 FIFA World Cup players
Swiss Super League players